Canarina eminii is a species of flowering plant in the family Campanulaceae. It is an epiphytic or terrestrial, usually glaucous, herb. Its root is thick, often with a corky surface layer. Its stems are erect and scandent, pendent up to several meters in length, usually with a fine purplish mottling. Its leaves are triangular to ovate, up to 10 cm long, acute with cordate to cuneate base, dentate, double dentate or double serrate. Its corollas are funnel-shaped to 7.5 cm long, orange to orange-red with darker venation.

Distribution
It is found in upland and riverine forest, epiphytic or among rocks; altitude range 1600–3200 m. Very similar to C. abyssinica which is not epiphytic and has a slightly lower altitude range. It also lacks the purplish mottling of C. eminii and the leaves are triangular to pentagonal. Kenya: recorded in Elgon, Cheranganis, Tinderet, Mau, the Aberdares and Mount Kenya. Tanzania: recorded in Rungwe, Kiwira Forest. Uganda: recorded in Imatong Mountains and Mbale. Also recorded in Ethiopia, eastern Congo, Rwanda, Burundi and Malawi.

References

Sources
 Collins Guide to the Wildflowers of East Africa by Sir Michael Blundell, 1987. 
 Upland Kenya Wild Flowers and Ferns by A.D.Q. Agnew, 2013. 
 http://www.theplantlist.org/tpl/search?q=canarina

Campanuloideae
Flora of Burundi
Flora of Ethiopia
Flora of Kenya
Flora of Malawi
Flora of Rwanda
Flora of Sudan
Flora of Tanzania
Flora of Uganda
Flora of the Democratic Republic of the Congo
Taxa named by Paul Friedrich August Ascherson
Taxa named by Georg August Schweinfurth